Janaillat is a commune in the Creuse department in the Nouvelle-Aquitaine region in central France.

Geography

Population

Sights
 The church of St. Saturnine, dating from the nineteenth century.
 The ruins of a feudal castle at the hamlet of Soliers.
 A fifteenth-century chapel.

International relations
Janaillat is twinned with:
 Ennery, Moselle, France, since 1994

Personalities
 The poet François Tristan l'Hermite was born here at the castle in 1601.

See also
Communes of the Creuse department

References

Communes of Creuse